Dhok_Tahlian_Dam is located near village Dhok_Tahlian 20 km away from Chakwal District Punjab, Pakistan.

The dam was completed in 2001 at a cost of PKR 20.13 million.

See also
List of dams and reservoirs in Pakistan

Notes

Dams in Pakistan
Dams completed in 1994